Qt Extended (named Qtopia before September 30, 2008) is an application platform for embedded Linux-based mobile computing devices such as personal digital assistants, video projectors and mobile phones.  It was initially developed by The Qt Company, at the time known as Qt Software and a subsidiary of Nokia. When they cancelled the project the free software portion of it was forked by the community and given the name Qt Extended Improved. The QtMoko Debian-based distribution is the natural successor to these projects as continued by the efforts of the Openmoko community.

Features 
Qt Extended features:
 Windowing system
 Synchronization framework
 Integrated development environment
 Internationalization and localization support
 Games and multimedia
 Personal information manager applications
 Full screen handwriting
 Input methods
 Personalization options
 Productivity applications
 Internet applications
 Java integration
 Wireless support

Qt Extended is dual licensed under the GNU General Public License (GPL) and proprietary licenses.

Devices and deployment 
As of 2006, Qtopia was running on several million devices, including 11 mobile phone models and 30 other handheld devices.

Models included the Sharp Corporation Zaurus line of Linux handhelds, the Sony mylo, the Archos Portable Media Assistant (PMA430) (a multimedia device), the GamePark Holdings GP2X, Greenphone (an open phone initiative), Pocket PC, FIC Openmoko phones: Neo 1973 and FreeRunner. An unofficial hack allows its use on the Archos wifi series of portable media players (PMP) 604, 605, 705, and also on several Motorola phones such as E2, Z6 and A1200. The U980 of ZTE is the last phone running it.

Software development 
Native applications could be developed and compiled using C++. Managed applications could be developed in Java.

Discontinuation 
On March 3, 2009, Qt Software announced the discontinuation of Qt Extended as a standalone product, with some features integrated on the Qt Framework.

Qt Extended Improved 
The Openmoko community has forked the final stable release into Qt Extended Improved (later renamed to QtMoko) which, like its predecessor, is an application platform for embedded Linux-based mobile computing devices such as personal digital assistants, video projectors and mobile phones dual licensed under the GNU General Public License (GPL) and proprietary licenses.

Qt Extended Improved can run on several mobile devices, most notably the Openmoko phones: Neo 1973 and FreeRunner.

Other mobile operating systems 
 Access Linux Platform
 Android
 iOS
 MeeGo
 Nucleus RTOS
 Openmoko Linux
 Palm webOS
 Symbian
 Tizen
 Windows Mobile

References

External links 

 Qt Extended Whitepaper from Qt Software
 

Embedded Linux
Mobile Linux
Mobile software
Openmoko
Personal digital assistant software
Software forks
Software that uses Qt